Sophie Milman (born 1983) is a Russian-born Canadian jazz vocalist.

After emigrating from Russia in the early 1990s, Milman, who is Jewish, spent most of her childhood years in Israel where she listened extensively to jazz. Her family later emigrated to Toronto, Canada.

Milman's self-titled debut album was released on October 12, 2004, in Canada by Linus Entertainment and in 2006 in the United States by Koch. She graduated from the University of Toronto in 2011 with a Bachelor of Commerce degree.

Milman is married to lawyer, professor, and musician Casey Chisick. He was executive producer on her albums Make Someone Happy (2007) and Take Love Easy (Sophie Milman album)|Take Love Easy  (2009) as well as her concert DVD Live in Montreal (2008).

Milman's recording of "So Long, You Fool" is used in commercials for Air Wick's Winter Collection candles.

Milman won 2008 Juno Award for Vocal Jazz Album of the Year for Make Someone Happy. She earned a Grammy Award nomination in 2018 for her involvement with Yiddish Glory.

Discography
 Sophie Milman (Linus Entertainment, 2006)
 Make Someone Happy (Linus, 2007)
 Take Love Easy (Linus, 2009)
 In the Moonlight (eOne, 2011)
 Live at the Winter Garden Theatre (Linus, 2013)
 In The Moonlight (2018)

References

External links

 
 

1983 births
Living people
Jewish Canadian musicians
Jewish singers
Canadian women jazz singers
Canadian people of Russian-Jewish descent
Juno Award for Vocal Jazz Album of the Year winners
Russian Ashkenazi Jews
Russian emigrants to Israel
Israeli emigrants to Canada
Musicians from Toronto
Jewish jazz musicians
21st-century Canadian women singers